Micheldorf in Oberösterreich is a municipality in the district of Kirchdorf an der Krems in the Austrian state of Upper Austria.

Population

History
The municipality bears the coat of arms of its former lords, the Jörger von Tollet family.

References

Cities and towns in Kirchdorf an der Krems District